The ancient theatre of Taormina is an ancient Greek theatre in Taormina, Sicily, built in the third century BC.

History
A Hellenistic theatre stood at Taormina from around the third century BC. The remains of another Hellenistic building have been found under the Roman cavea. Under Roman rule, the theatre was rebuilt, probably around the time of Hadrian or Trajan. It was remodelled in the third century AD, with the orchestra turned into an arena and the stage removed.

Description
It is one of the oldest theatres in Magna Graeca to have curved cavea, rather than the older trapezoidal design. The cavea were divided into nine sections. On either side of the skene was a basilica. Today, the theatre is used as a venue for the annual arts festival Taormina Arte.

See also

 List of ancient Greek theatres
 Greek Theatre of Syracuse
 History of Taormina

References

External links

 View at 360° of Teatro antico di Taormina
 TravelTaormina.com

Taormina
Taormina
Theatres in Sicily
Taormina
7th-century BC establishments in Italy
Archaeological sites in Sicily